Leicester station could refer to:

 Leicester railway station, a railway station in Leicester, England, formerly on the MR
 Leicester Campbell Street railway station, a former name for the above
 Leicester London Road railway station, a former name for the above
 Leicester Central railway station, a former GCR station in Leicester, England
 Leicester North railway station, a heritage railway station
 Leicester station (New York), a disused station in Leicester, New York